Lionel Lewis may refer to:

Lionel Lewis, a retired Singaporean footballer
Lionel, Lewis, a village in Scotland

See also
Leona Lewis